Charles S. Klabunde (born October 1, 1935) is an American artist whose work has been characterized both as existential realism and as fantastical symbolism. He was born in Omaha, Nebraska.

Early life and education
Klabunde began drawing as a young boy.  Because he was learning disabled, his parents encouraged him to become a house painter.  It never occurred to anyone, including Klabunde, that art would become his career.

After high school, Klabunde studied drafting at the Omaha Technical School. When he completed the program, he went to work for his grandfather, an engineer, as a surveyor for a new housing development.  Klabunde had no plans to attend college until a co-worker his own age persuaded him to enroll. Klabunde earned his B.F.A. in 1958 from the University of Nebraska and then attended graduate school at the University of Iowa, earning his M.F.A. in 1962.  While at Iowa, he met the Argentine printmaker, Mauricio Lasansky, who encouraged him to build a career as an etcher.

In 1965 Klabunde moved  to Edgewater, New Jersey, and working as a designer of interiors - classrooms and labs - for NYU.  In 1967, he found an apartment in Greenwich Village and was able to open his first studio.

One of his first commissions was from Lublin Graphics, which led to shows at local galleries.  Soon, about 30 galleries were carrying his work.  Museums, too, were receptive to his work. The first to purchase one of his pieces was the Metropolitan Museum of Art.

In 1971, he received a Guggenheim Fellowship.

Art
Klabunde's is a prolific printmaker and painter.  His prints are made on a custom-made English press using four-color, hand-engraved copper plates, which produces contours and colors with an antique appearance.  He mixes his own ink and hand-pulls each print.

Victoria Donohoe, writing in The Philadelphia Inquirer, described Klabunde as an artist who elevates printmaking because he takes great interest in exploiting the special qualities that make etching an expressive medium with unique characteristics rather than using it, say, only as a method of reproducing pencil drawings. He knows well how to handle the thin transparent scrims of color upon color, and he introduces patterned materials such as lace to obtain the surface quality he wants. His color sense and a story-telling bias distinguish him.

The artist tends to focus on a subject and then create a series of works around it.  While he generally draws inspiration from biblical or mythological themes, he has also been inspired by African and other tribal art.

His collections include:
Studies in Greek Mythology: Flesh & Stone Paintings - a series of 10
Shadows & Ceremonies - a series of 36 pencil drawings and 30 oil paintings celebrating masked African and New Guinea tribal ceremonial dancers and portraits of the faces behind the masks.
Passion of Christ - A series of 8 etchings and pencil drawings
Angels Without Gods - A series of 10 oil paintings and 12 pencil drawings
Empty-ness of Laughter - A series of 13 oil paintings and pencil drawings based on a study of prisoners in Louisiana.

Early work
In style, his early drawings, and prints could be described as fantasy art.  They could also be described as a cross between the woodcuts of Albrecht Dürer and illustrations for Grimm's Fairy Tales.  He creates symbolic vignettes using Medieval or Renaissance figures and settings, to which the viewer may apply his own interpretations.

Klabunde's black-and-white or color etchings feature dense, highly complex, and fascinating imagery.  What seem at first to be simple fantasy pictures are, in fact, much more.
 
Typically, the artist's etchings are full of Gothick elements (Hellmouths, gargoyles, and elaborate tracery) and fantastic details (acrobats dangling from ropes presumably suspended on skyhooks, and cablecars with dragons on their roofs.)  These technically astounding scenes require several viewings to appreciate fully.  However, he best prints are his least fussy ones, works such as Icarus and The Puppeteer which feature unexpected arrangements of a limited number of figures.

Later work

While many artists employ drawings either as preliminary studies for paintings or separate statements, Klabunde's are both. While serving to guide the compositions of his large oils on canvas, they are also finished statements in their own right.

Klabunde is sometimes compared to Francis Bacon, as the two artists share an ability to create the sense of an encounter with a palpable human presence placed in a frontal pose at the center of the composition, invariably against dark backgrounds that cast the figures in stark relief. While Bacon assaults the viewer with the visceral jolt of seeing the human image flayed like a side of beef, Klabunde confronts us with the culture shock of a spiritual tradition far different from our own.

By 2002, Klabunde had moved from inner demons and internal fantasies toward a new affirmation of life.  This was a natural consequence of his move away from nihilism and existentialism, toward spiritual transcendence.  Now the bodies that he presents are ideally beautiful in the majestic series of very large pencil drawing poetically entitled Burned by the Fire of Our Dreams.

European box books

Klabunde has created etchings and engravings for four books.  Each is printed on B.F.K. Rieves paper and boxed in clothbound deluxe European box books.

Cycle of Sangsaric Phenomena: The Tibetan Book of the Dead (1967)
The Seven Deadly Sins (1971)
Samuel Beckett's The Lost Ones (1984)
Studies of the Revolutionary Mind (2000)

In each series, Klabunde's images illuminate, rather than merely illustrate, the texts.  In the etching Cycle of Sangsaric Phenomena #III, for example, the mystical qualities of the Tibetan Book of the Dead are conveyed with surreal figures orbiting a darkly cross-hatched cosmos around a brilliant orb that could appear to be a portal to their next incarnation.

By contrast, in The Seven Deadly Sins series, various preposterously grotesque beings recall Odilon Redon's desire to create figures that are impossible according to the laws of possibility. When we view Klabunde's work we recognize the bloated, covetous figure of Greed and the fanged monster of Anger as symbolic surrogates of our own worst traits.

In 1982 Klabunde began making etchings for Beckett's The Lost Ones, the story of an other-worldly tribe trapped inside a cylinder. Working with Charles Altschul, publisher of New Overbrook Press, the artist's book contains seven hand-pulled intaglio prints placed loosely inside a handmade folio box with unbound pages of text.

Klabunde's drawings imagine the characters as bulbous, Bosch-like concretions, twisted into contortionist poses, and labeled with such titles as The Lull, The Spectacle and The Last State.

The New Overbrook Press edition of The Lost Ones was published on April 13, 1984, Beckett's 78th birthday. The next year Klabunde traveled to Paris and spent time with Beckett, who upon the book's publication, had sent his warm congratulations to the publisher and the artist for those terrifying images.  Beckett signed all 250 copies of this limited edition book.

This series, especially, exemplifies the Existential Realist phase of the artist's work.

Influences

Klabunde's imagery and iconography, although highly individualistic, is often traced from the work of Bosch, Dürer, Breughel, Callot, Rembrandt, Blake, Goya, Meryon, Redon, Klinger, Ensor, Magritte, Klee and Picasso.

Museum and individual holdings
James A. Michener Art Museum
University of Delaware
Metropolitan Museum of Art, New York	    
Museum of Modern Art, New York		        
National Gallery of Art, Washington, D.C.
Bibliothèque Nationale, Paris
Philadelphia Museum of Art, Philadelphia
Museo Municipal de Arts Graficas, Mara Caibo
J.P. Morgan Library, New York	        
New York Public Library, New York
Library of Congress, Washington, D.C.    
Art Institute of Chicago, Chicago
Brooklyn Museum of Art, New York    
Minneapolis Institute of Art, Minneapolis
Minnesota Museum of Art, Minneapolis    
Sheldon Memorial Art Gallery
Indianapolis Museum of Art, Indianapolis	
Memorial Art Gallery, Rochester, NY
Kemper Art Collection, Chicago		        
Arkansas Art Center
Harvard University Library
Columbia University Library, New York	    
Newberry Library, Chicago			        
New Orleans Fine Arts Museum		        
Museum of Modern Art, San Francisco
N.J. State Council on Arts Acquisition Award, 1987
N.J. Governor's Official Residence  (Drumthwachet)
National Gallery of Ireland

Major exhibitions and shows

Minneapolis Institute of Art, 1963 - Solo Exhibition
Whitney Museum of American Art, 1970 - Five New York Printmakers
Sheldon Memorial Gallery, University of Nebraska, 1972 & 1980 - Retrospective
New York University, 1970 - Solo Exhibition
Philadelphia Art Alliance, 1973 - Solo Exhibition
Cedar Rapids Museum of Art, Iowa, 1973 & 1980 - Retrospective
The Print Club, Philadelphia, 1980 - Retrospective
American Associated Artists, 1970 & 1980 - Retrospective
St. MaryÍs College, Maryland, 1975 - Solo Exhibition
University of Maine, 1975 - Solo Exhibition
Franz Bader Gallery, Washington, D.C., 1976, 1979 & 1983 - Retrospective
Van Stratten Gallery, Chicago, 1976 & 1979 - Retrospective
Borgia Palace, Rome, 1976 - Vatican Exhibition
Channel 13, New York, 1979 - Artist Presentation
New Orleans Academy of Fine Arts, 1985 - Retrospective
Antiquarian Society, London, England - Solo Exhibition
Galerie Lucie Weill, Paris - Solo Exhibition
University of Maine - Solo Exhibition
Clinton Art Center - Solo Exhibition
Stover Mill, Erwinna, PA - Solo Exhibition
San Jose, Costa Rica (Exhibition and Promotion of La Marta Project, 1996)

Publications, awards and lectures
"Liberal Content" 1962
"Iowan" 1963
"laRevue Modernes des Arts de la Vie," Paris 1964
New Jersey Council of Arts, 1988, Purchase Award
Davidson College, 1973, Purchase Award
The Print Club, 1975, Purchase Award
La Tertulia Museum, Cali, Colombia, South America, 1976, Purchase Award
National Academy of Design, 1979, Purchase Award
Brooklyn Museum of Art School Lecture
Webster College, St. Louis Lecture
Gilford College, Greensboro, N.C. Lecture
American Associated Artists, International Collection, 1971, 1973, 1975 and 1978
Collaboration with Samuel Beckett (7 Engraved Images for The Lost Ones, 1984)
ULACIT, San Jose, Costa Rica (La Marta Project, 1996)
La Marta Documentary Video (1997)
Emory University, Atlanta, Lecture Word & Image: Samuel Beckett & the Visual Text (1999)
National Gallery of Ireland (2006) Beckett Centenary Festival: Beckett & The Visual Arts, Dublin, Ireland

References

External links
Artist’s website

1935 births
Living people
American artists
University of Nebraska alumni
University of Iowa alumni